"Walking on Sunshine" is a song by Eddy Grant, and the title track of his third studio album. It was released as a single in 1979. Grant's original version was not a hit, but the song was remade three years later by Rockers Revenge, a studio project assembled by producer Arthur Baker, which became the hit version.

Rockers Revenge version

Rockers Revenge released their version as a single in 1982, with vocals by Donnie Calvin. It peaked at number four on the UK Singles Chart and reached the top thirty in Belgium, the Netherlands, and New Zealand. The single did not chart on the Billboard Hot 100, but was number one on the Billboard Hot Dance Club Play chart for one week and also peaked at number 63 on the Billboard Hot Black Singles chart. The song's bassline would later be sampled in Eleanor's 1988 song "Adventure", itself a number-one Dance Club Play hit in 1988.

Personnel
 Fred Zarr – bass guitar, keyboard instrument
 Donnie Calvin – vocals
 Bashiri Johnson – percussion 
 Jellybean Benitez and Arthur Baker – mixers

Chart performance and certifications

Weekly charts

Certifications

References

1979 songs
1979 singles
1982 singles
Eddy Grant songs
London Records singles
Song recordings produced by Arthur Baker (musician)
Songs written by Eddy Grant